La gente de la Universal is a 1991 Colombian drama film directed by Felipe Aljure.

References

External links 

1991 drama films
1991 films
Colombian drama films
1990s Spanish-language films